Youth Is Wasted on the Young is the debut studio album by Swedish rock band the Twelve Caesars.

Track listing
"Sort It Out" – 3:37
"Let's Go Parking Baby" – 2:36
"I'm Gonna Kick You Out" – 2:52
"You're My Favourite" – 2:03
"My Abduction Love" – 3:50
"Optic Nerve" – 3:51
"The Cannibals" – 3:00
"Anything You Want" – 2:54
"She's a Planet" – 2:25
"Suzy Creamcheese" – 4:05 (Originally by Teddy and His Patches)
"You Are My Favourite 2" – 2:52
"You Don't Mean a Thing to Me" – 4:36
"Out of My Hands" – 3:37 (Originally by the Endd)

Charts

References

1998 debut albums
Caesars (band) albums
Minty Fresh Records albums